Antonio Cordasco (5 June 186319 April 1921) was an Italian-Canadian labourer, employment agent, banker, and newspaper owner. He was a well-known padrone (migrant labour recruiter and contractor) based in Montreal. He emigrated to the city in 1886 from Calabria and became a British subject in 1902. He also published a newspaper the Corriere del Canada, which helped him recruit migrant labourers from Italy to work on the Canadian Pacific Railway. He was eventually targeted by authorities and accused of making inaccurate claims in order to recruit Italian workers. After a series of public inquiries, the CPR ended its relationship with Cordasco which also ended his recruiting empire.

References

1863 births
1921 deaths
People from Calabria
People from Montreal
Naturalized citizens of Canada
Italian emigrants to Canada
19th-century Canadian newspaper publishers (people)
20th-century Canadian newspaper publishers (people)